Claw-Lightning and Claw-Thunderbolt were Turkish Armed Forces cross border military operations in northern Iraq. The operations took place in the Metina, Zap and Avashin-Basyan regions against Kurdistan Workers' Party (PKK) targets, as part of the ongoing Kurdish–Turkish conflict.

Operations
The operations began on the evening of 23 April 2021, with air and howitzer strikes targeting PKK positions in Northern Iraq. In the following hours of the strikes Turkish paratroopers and commandos airdropped from Chinook and Black Hawk helicopters to the points of Metina, Zap and Avashin-Basyan regions. Turkish Defense Ministry announced the "neutralization" of 142 militants and the destruction of 500 targets while announcing 12 killed of their own.

Clashes between PKK and Peshmerga
On 6 June 2021, clashes occurred between Peshmerga and PKK resulting in the deaths of 5 Peshmerga. On 8 June 2021, 2 Peshmerga were kidnapped by PKK while another one was killed.

Civilian impact 
The operation is known to have impact on civilians, fleeing the operation area.

References 

April 2021 events in Iraq
Airstrikes conducted by the Turkish Air Force
Cross-border operations of Turkey into Iraq
History of the Kurdistan Workers' Party
Kurdish–Turkish conflict (2015–present)
2021 airstrikes
2021 in Iraqi Kurdistan
2021 in international relations
2021 military operations